The short track speed skating  competitions at the 2019 Southeast Asian Games in the Philippines was held from 3 to 4 December 2019 at the SM Megamall Ice Rink.

Competition schedule
The following is the schedule for the short track speed skating competitions. All times are Philippine Standard Time (UTC+8).

Medal summary

Medal table

Medalists

References

External links
 

2019
Southeast Asian Games
2019 Southeast Asian Games events